The Drama Studio is an intimate 177 seat theatre venue owned by the University of Sheffield and operated by the University’s Performance Venues department. Opened in 1970, it is housed in the former Glossop Road Baptist Church and retains many of the original architectural features. The studio also offers 3 individual rehearsal spaces that are available to hire.

The Drama Studio offers an adaptable playing space that can be configured in many different ways. The standard main stage area is 8mx7m, with options to add more seating or staging as required. The studio is also equipped with a full professional lighting and sound system.

The studio is used throughout the year by University affiliated theatre groups, local amateur dramatics societies and professional touring artists & musicians. The bi-annual Enable US festival is also resident in the Drama Studio. Enable US is a project within the University’s Performance Venues for creative expression, exploration, development and debate, which aims to provide new and innovative performing arts companies a platform to perform in Sheffield.

See also
 University of Sheffield
 University of Sheffield Octagon Centre
 University of Sheffield Union of Students

References

External links
Performance Venues official website

Churches completed in 1871
Sheffield University buildings and structures
Grade II listed buildings in Sheffield
Studio theatres in Sheffield
University of Sheffield
University and college theatres in England